Carcamusa is a traditional dish of Spanish cuisine and a speciality of Toledo, often served as a bar-snack . It is made from pork and seasonal vegetables stewed with tomatoes and bay leaves. It is a dish best served hot, traditionally in a small earthenware dish accompanied by a few slices of bread. It may be also served with tomato, peas or beans spiced with hot chilli pepper sauce.

Popular culture suggests its name arises from a pun.  Camush is usually game meat (often venison) but can also mean wrinkled, since the bar where it was invented was frequented by male customers of a certain age (the wrinklies or carcass) entertaining some younger girls for amusement (their muses).

References

Spanish cuisine
Tapas